Elections were held in the organized municipalities in the Sudbury District of Ontario on October 27, 2014 in conjunction with municipal elections across the province.

Baldwin

Chapleau

Espanola

French River

Killarney

Markstay-Warren

Nairn and Hyman

Sables-Spanish Rivers

St. Charles

References

Sudbury
Sudbury District